Kanwaka is an unincorporated community in Douglas County, Kansas, United States.  It is located 4 miles west of Lawrence. The name is a portmanteau of the Kansas and Wakarusa Rivers.

History
Kanwaka was first settled in 1854. Kanwaka had a post office from 1857 to 1870 and again from 1898 until 1900.

Geography
Kanwaka is located at the intersection of U.S. Highway 40 and Stull Road.

References

Further reading

External links
 Douglas County maps: Current, Historic, KDOT

Unincorporated communities in Douglas County, Kansas
Unincorporated communities in Kansas
1854 establishments in Kansas Territory